Cao Ngọc Hùng (10 March 1990) is a Vietnamese male paralympic javelin thrower.

In 2016 he won the bronze medal in the men's javelin throw F57 event at the 2016 Summer Paralympics.

References

External links
IPC Profile
London 2012 Profile 

1990 births
Living people
Paralympic competitors for Vietnam
Athletes (track and field) at the 2012 Summer Paralympics
Athletes (track and field) at the 2016 Summer Paralympics
Athletes (track and field) at the 2020 Summer Paralympics
Paralympic bronze medalists for Vietnam
Paralympic medalists in athletics (track and field)
Medalists at the 2016 Summer Paralympics
Vietnamese javelin throwers
Medalists at the 2010 Asian Para Games
Medalists at the 2014 Asian Para Games